Van den Berg is a Dutch-language toponymic surname meaning "of/from the mountain/slope". With 58,562 people carrying the name, it was the fourth most common surname in The Netherlands in 2007. Variants are Van de Berg, Van der Berg, Van den Berge. Van den Bergh, Van den Berghe and Van den Berghen. Anglicised forms are generally agglutinated and variably capitalized, e.g. "Vandenberg". The abbreviated form is "v.d. Berg"  (i.e. Rudolf v.d. Berg). People with the surname include:

Van den Berg
Ad van den Berg (born 1944), Dutch politician who advocated legalizing pedophilia
Adrianus van den Berg (born 1954), Dutch rock guitarist
Albert Van den Berg (resistant) (1890-1945), saved hundreds of Jews
Albert van den Berg (physicist) (born 1957), Dutch physicist
Albert van den Berg (born 1976), South African rugby player
Albert Jan van den Berg (born 1949), Dutch jurist
Aldo van den Berg (born 1978), South African cricketer 
Bart van den Berg (born 1993), Dutch tennis player
Carel van den Berg (1924–1971), Dutch chess master
Cássio van den Berg (born 1971),  Brazilian botanist
Charl Van Den Berg (born 1981), South African model and LGBT activist
Daniella van den Berg (born 1996), Aruban swimmer
 (born 1987), Dutch model
Dirk van den Berg (born 1966), German film director and producer
 (born 1943), Dutch sculptor
Floris van den Berg (born 1973) Dutch philosopher, author, Director of CFI Low Countries
Gerard van den Berg (born 1932), Dutch TV show host
Gerard J. van den Berg (born 1962), Dutch econometrician
Gert van den Berg (cyclist) (1903–?), Dutch racing cyclist
Gert van den Berg (politician) (born 1935), Dutch SGP politician
Gillian van den Berg (born 1971), Dutch water polo player
Han van den Berg (born 1925), Dutch rower
Harman van den Berg (1918–2006), South African football midfielder
Helma van den Berg (19652003), Dutch linguist of Caucasian languages
Hugo van den Berg (born 1990), Dutch Grand Prix motorcycle racer
Jack van den Berg (born 1959), Dutch football coach
Jacq van den Berg (born 1916), Dutch competitive sailor
Jan van den Bergh (painter) (1587–1660), Dutch painter
Jan van den Berg (footballer) (1879–1951), Dutch footballer
Jan Hendrik van den Berg (1914–2012), Dutch psychologist
Janwillem van den Berg (1920–1985), Dutch speech scientist
Jeen van den Berg (1928–2014), Dutch speed skater, winner of the Elfstedentocht in 1954
Joba van den Berg (born 1958), Dutch politician
Joey van den Berg (born 1986), Dutch football midfielder
Johannes van den Berg (born 1946) Dutch Musician better known as Harry Vanda 
Julius van den Berg (born 1996), Dutch cyclist
Ko van den Berg (born 1950), Dutch competitive sailor
Laura van den Berg (born 1983), American novelist
Lodewijk van den Berg (1932–2022), Dutch-born American chemical engineer and astronaut
 Lodewijk Willem Christiaan van den Berg (1845–1927), Dutch scholar
Luciano van den Berg (1984–2005), Dutch football defender
Mandy van den Berg (born 1990), Dutch football defender
Marco van den Berg (born 1965), Dutch basketball coach
Max van den Berg (born 1956), Dutch politician, Labour Party chairman from 1999-2007
Mien van den Berg (1909–1996), Dutch gymnast
Morné van den Berg (born 1997), South African rugby player 
Nick van den Berg (born 1980), Dutch pool player
Niekie van den Berg, South African politician and talk radio host
Paul van den Berg (born 1936), Belgian football midfielder
 (born 1971), Dutch football defender and coach
Quinten van den Berg (born 1985), Dutch DJ and Musical Producer known as Quintino
Roy van den Berg (born 1988), Dutch track cyclist
Rudolf van den Berg (born 1949), Dutch film director
Sepp van den Berg (born 2001), Dutch footballer
Sjef van den Berg (born 1995), Dutch competitive archer
Stephan van den Berg (born 1962), Dutch windsurfer, first gold medalist in Olympic windsurfing
Trudy van den Berg (born 1947), Dutch pop singer
Ulrich van den Berg (born 1975), South African golfer
Vincent van den Berg (born 1989), Dutch football forward
Willem van den Berg (1910–1987), Dutch fencer
Wilma van den Berg (born 1947), Dutch sprinter

Van de Berg
Ed Vande Berg (born 1958), American baseball player
Jeff Vandeberg, Dutch born American architect
Linda van de Berg, Dutch track racing cyclist
Tim van de Berg (born 1997), Dutch football midfielder

Van der Berg
Dirk van der Berg (born 1967), South African cricketer 
Hayes van der Berg (born 1994), South African cricketer

Van den Berge
Jojanneke van den Berge (born 1980), Dutch journalist
Niels van den Berge (born 1984), Dutch GreenLeft politician
Rinus van den Berge (1900–1972), Dutch sprinter

Other uses
Hendrik J. and Wilhelmina H. Van Den Berg Cottage, listed on the National Register of Historic Places in Marion County, Iowa

See also
 Vandenberg (surname)
 Van den Heuvel, similar Dutch surname meaning "of/from the hill"
 Van der Burg. Dutch surname sounding similar in English pronunciation, meaning "from the fortress"

References

Dutch-language surnames
Dutch toponymic surnames
Surnames of Dutch origin
Afrikaans-language surnames